Hyles euphorbiarum is a moth of the  family Sphingidae.

Distribution 
It is known from Chile, Argentina, the Falklands, Uruguay, Paraguay and southern Brazil.

Description

Biology 
Adults have been recorded in March, July, September and November, but are probably on wing throughout the year.

The larvae feed on Fabaceae, Nyctaginaceae, Onagraceae, Polygonaceae, Portulacaceae, Solanaceae and possibly Euphorbiaceae species.

References

Hyles (moth)
Moths described in 1835